Blood Legacy (also called Legacy of Blood and Will to Die) is a 1971 horror film directed by Carl Monson and starring Rodolfo Acosta, Merry Anders, Norman Bartold, John Carradine, and Faith Domergue.

Synopsis

In this 1971 effort, Christopher Dean (John Carradine) has died; his four adult children Greg, Veronica, Johnnie, and Leslie, and their spouses, as well Christopher's longtime three servants have been called to the mansion to hear Christopher's previously taped last will. The servants are to receive a salary of $500 a month as long as they stay on; the children are to receive equal portions of the $136 million balance of the estate; however, if any die, the remainder will go to the survivors. If all of the children die, the servants inherit what is left. The children must for some reason stay in the deceased's house for one week in order to inherit. In this taped message, Christopher makes plain that he has no affection or respect for his four offspring; he advises them to run away from his offer if they have any virtue.

The killings begin promptly with the murder of Mrs. Greg Dean's dog, proceed to the decapitation of the police officer called about the incident, and continue until one individual survives. The terms of the will are such as to cast suspicion on any of the parties present. The surprise, and illogical, twist is who conducted the killings and why.

Produced by Bennett Rombouts, directed by Carl Monson.

There is a 1978 film of the same name and similar plot, not to be confused with this one.

Cast
Rodolfo Acosta: Sheriff Dan Garcia
Merry Anders: Laura Dean
Norman Bartold: Tom Drake
Ivy Bethune: Elga
John Carradine: Christopher Dean
Richard Davalos: Johnny Dean
Faith Domergue: Veronica Dean
Buck Kartalian: Igor Garin
Brooke Mills: Leslie Dean
Jeff Morrow: Gregory Dean
John Russell: Frank Mantee
John Smith: Dr. Carl Isenburg
Mr. Chin: Chin

Presentations
Horror hostess Elvira, Mistress of the Dark (Cassandra Peterson) presented Blood Legacy as part of her Movie Macabre series. The film was also riffed by the cast of Cinematic Titanic.

External links
 

1971 films
American horror films
1970s English-language films
1970s American films